Joseph F. Harmon is a Guyanese politician who served as Leader of the Opposition from 2020 to 2022. He previously served as Director-General of the Ministry of the Presidency, under the David Granger administration.

Harmon was born in Pouderoyen, a village in the West Demerara region. Harmon is a former Lt. Col in the Guyana Defence Force and attorney at law.

In June 2021, a motion of no confidence was filed against him due to his claims that the APNU and AFC coalition won the 2020 General election. He has not meet with Irfaan Ali, Guyana's president, as Ali refuses to meet until Harmon recognises the legitimacy of his government.
Joseph Harmon was one the main supporter of the 2020 election rigging in Guyana. He support fraudulent numbers declared by an compromised GECOM staff. He was a candidate for leadership of the People's National Congress but lost in a landslide to longtime member and political activist, Aubrey Norton.

References

Guyanese politicians
Living people
Year of birth missing (living people)
Members of the National Assembly (Guyana)
People's National Congress (Guyana) politicians
People from Essequibo Islands-West Demerara
Afro-Guyanese people
Guyanese military personnel